Re-Entry is the fourth studio album by American hip hop record producer Marley Marl. It was released on November 2, 2001 via Barely Breaking Even, serving as the fourth installment in BBE Music Beat Generation series. Recording sessions took place at House of Hits in Chestnut Ridge, NY and at Pauls Studio in Queens. Beside Marl, production was handled by 88-Fingers, Easy Mo Bee, J-Force and Kev Brown. It features guest appearances from Edwin Birdsong, J. Wells, Seven Shawn, Big Daddy Kane, Capone, Grap Luva, Kev Brown, Larry-O, Miss Man, Roy Ayers, Solo, The Hemmingways and Troy Sluggs.

Track listing

References

External links

2001 albums
Marley Marl albums
Barely Breaking Even albums
Albums produced by Easy Mo Bee
Albums produced by Marley Marl